The 2001 GP Miguel Induráin was the 48th edition of the GP Miguel Induráin cycle race and was held on 7 April 2001. The race started and finished in Estella. The race was won by Ángel Vicioso.

General classification

References

2001
2001 in Spanish road cycling